Gaming may refer to:

Games and sports
The act of playing games, as in:
 Legalized gambling, playing games of chance for money, often referred to in law as "gaming"
 Playing a role-playing game, in which players assume fictional roles
 Playing a tabletop game, any game played on a flat surface
 Playing a video game, an electronic game with a video interface
 Esports, competing in eSports
 Video game culture

Other uses
Gaming, Austria, an Austrian market town and municipality 
 Gaming the system, manipulating a system's rules to achieve a desired outcome

See also

 Gamble (disambiguation)
 Game (disambiguation)
 Gamer, a person who plays games, especially video games
 History of games
 Online gaming (disambiguation)